Iran Sportsperson of the Year was an annual election from 2000 to 2008, organized by Iran's Physical Education Organization and IRIB, which honours outstanding achievement(s) in sport by Iranian athletes during the previous Iranian year.

Winners

See also
Athlete of the Year
Laureus World Sports Award for Sportsman of the Year (Laureus World Sports Academy)
Laureus World Sports Award for Sportswoman of the Year

References
 IRIB

Sport in Iran
National sportsperson-of-the-year trophies and awards
Awards established in 2001
2001 establishments in Iran